Sandown Lifeboat Station is owned and run by Sandown and Shanklin Independent Lifeboat Service. It is located in the town of Sandown in the English county and island of the Isle of Wight.

Lifeboats

The organisation operates an ex-RNLI B-class Atlantic 21 rigid inflatable boat (RIB) and is powered by twin 70 hp Evinrude engines. This lifeboat was once called Kirklees (B-553) and served at Newbiggin, Helvic Head before she arrived at Sandown in 2000.  This Inshore Lifeboat was sold onto Lagan Search & Rescue in 2013 and now operates in Belfast Northern Ireland.

In 2011, SSILB launched their current Inshore Lifeboat, again an Atlantic 21, The Dove II. The naming of The Dove 2 has historic roots; the original Dove was a lifeboat based in Shanklin between 1884 and 1916. The ex-RNLI vessel was B-590, once called 'Wolverson X-Ray', serving at RNLI Mudeford, Aberystwyth, Kilrush, Galway, Youghal and Cullercoats within the RNLI relief fleet and then went on to crew training before being sold to SSILB in 2009.

See also
 Independent lifeboats (British Isles)

References 

Lifeboat stations on the Isle of Wight
Organisations based on the Isle of Wight
Independent Lifeboat stations